Pedregoso (Literally: Stony) is a town the Pinos Municipality, State of Zacatecas, Mexico. It is located 135 km southeast of the Zacatecas City, 86.5 km from Aguascalientes City, 118 km from San Luis Potosí City, and 25 km from Pinos.

Population
It has a population of 2,629 inhabitants (2010 Mexico census), making it the second most populous town in the municipality and, together with Pinos, one of the only two urban centers that exist in it.

References

Populated places in Zacatecas